Chris Tavershima Shimbayev (born 28 December 2001) is a Nigerian footballer.

Career statistics

Club

Notes

References

2001 births
Living people
Nigerian footballers
Association football forwards
China League One players
Suzhou Dongwu F.C. players
Nigerian expatriate footballers
Expatriate footballers in China
Nigerian expatriate sportspeople in China